The Xinjiang Victims Database is a database which attempts to record all currently known individuals who are detained in Xinjiang internment camps in China. The database has documented over 16,000 victims.

It was founded by Russian American researcher Gene Bunin. Bunin started the database in September 2018.

The database contains the names and biographical details of people who are thought to be detained in the camps. Many of the profiles also contain personal testimony from the family and friends of detainees.

Description
Gene Bunin is a Russian-American linguistic researcher, who had lived in Xinjiang until 2018, when Chinese police forced him to leave the country. He started the database to “have one place" to store detailed information of people interred in prison camps or disappeared after only "limited attempts" had been made to identify detainees.

See also
China Cables
Xinjiang papers
Xinjiang Police Files

References

External links
 

Xinjiang conflict
Databases